Alexander Riazantsev may refer to:

 Aleksandr Ryazantsev (born 1986), Russian footballer
 Alexander Riazantsev (ice hockey) (born 1980), Russian ice hockey player
 Alexander Riazantsev (chess player) (born 1985), Russian chess Grandmaster